Ancylodinia is a monotypic snout moth genus described by Joseph de Joannis in 1913. Its only species, Ancylodinia rectilineella, described by the same author in the same year, is known from Eritrea.

References

Phycitinae
Monotypic moth genera
Moths of Africa